This is a timeline of the Yuan dynasty (1271–1368). The Yuan dynasty was founded by the Mongol warlord Kublai Khan in 1271 and conquered the Song dynasty in 1279. The Yuan dynasty lasted nearly a hundred years before a series of rebellions known as the Red Turban Rebellion resulted in its collapse in 1368 and the rise of the Ming dynasty.

Kublai Khan's early life

1210s

1220s

1230s

1240s

1250s

Division of the Mongol Empire

1260s

1270s

Yuan dynasty

1270s

1280s

1290s

1300s

1310s

1320s

1330s

1340s

1350s

1360s

Gallery

See also
Timeline of the Mongol Empire
Timeline of the Ilkhanate
Timeline of the Chagatai Khanate
Timeline of the Golden Horde
Timeline of the Northern Yuan

References

See also
Administrative divisions of the Yuan dynasty

Bibliography

 .

 .

 
 
 
 
 
 
 
 
 .
 

 
 

 
Dynasties in Chinese history
Mongol states
History of Mongolia
02
01
Medieval Asia
Former countries in East Asia
Khanates
Former monarchies of East Asia
Yuan